Harold Payne may refer to:

Harold Payne (golfer) in West Virginia Amateur Championship
Harold Payne (musician) on Peregrins (album)

See also
Harry Payne (disambiguation)